Tumgan (also known as Turkshad, Turxanthos or Turksanf) was a shad (governor prince) of the Turkic Empire (also called Göktürk) in the late 6th century. According to Edward Gibbon his name may be a title rather than a proper name.

Background
In 552 Bumin founded the Gokturk Empire. His younger brother Istämi was viceroy (Yabghu) in the west. In 575 Istämi was followed by Tardu. By 575/76 Tamgan held some kind of power in the far west around the Volga River. He was probably Tardu's younger brother.

Relations with the Byzantine Empire
Because of the geographic position of his region, Tamgan was responsible in diplomatic relations with Byzantine Empire. (Hence, the historical sources about Tamgan are mostly the reports of  Byzantine envoys). Initially Turkic and Byzantine Empires were allies against Sassanid Iran and Pannonian Avars.  However, according to Byzantine historian Menander Protector, a Byzantine envoy named Valentinos visited Tamgan's headquarters where Tamgan accused Byzantines for the recently signed treaty between the Byzantine Empire and the Avars. He said that the Byzantines were liars and had ten tongues, meaning they were unreliable as allies. He also threatened the Byzantine side mentioning the rivers Danapr, Istr and Evr. (Former names of Dnieper, Danube and Maritsa.)  Following this accusation, Turks began to capture Byzantine possessions around north east Black Sea coasts and even Crimea. Briefly, a part of Bosporan Kingdom in Crimea, a vassal of Byzantine Empire fell to Turks. 
Tardu effectively fought in this area, but left his gains to Tamgan.  (About half a century later Byzantine Turkic relations recovered and Turks collaborated with Heraclius in the invasion of North Caucasus.)

Death
There is no record of Tamgan's death. However it is known that together with his brother he supported  Apa Khagan during the Turkic interregnum after 584. Thus Tamgan's death year can be located to be later than 584.

References

External links
 

6th-century Turkic people
Göktürk people
Ashina house of the Turkic Empire
Year of birth unknown